Stereo Drive is an album by jazz musician Cecil Taylor featuring John Coltrane. It was released in 1959 on United Artists Records, catalogue UAS 5014. The mono edition was issued as UAL 4014 with the title Hard Driving Jazz credited to The Cecil Taylor Quintet, and later reissued under Coltrane's name in 1962 as Coltrane Time (UAJS 15001). Compact disc reissues appeared on the Blue Note Records label credited to Coltrane. It is the only known recording featuring both Coltrane and Taylor.

Taylor has described how the record company determined the choice of musicians on the session: "I said 'Coltrane okay, but I want to use all the musicians that I want.' I wanted to use Ted Curson, who's a much more contemporary trumpet player than the trumpet player I ended up with, Kenny Dorham." Relations between Taylor, who favoured a very avant-garde approach, and Dorham, who verbally disapproved of Taylor's "way-out" tendencies, were strained.

Reception

In a review for AllMusic, Scott Yanow wrote: "Although Taylor and John Coltrane got along well, trumpeter Kenny Dorham... hated the avant-garde pianist's playing and was clearly bothered by Taylor's dissonant comping behind his solos. With bassist Chuck Israels and drummer Louis Hayes doing their best to ignore the discord, the group manages to perform two blues and two standards with Dorham playing strictly bop, Taylor coming up with fairly free abstractions, and Coltrane sounding somewhere in between. The results are unintentionally fascinating."

The authors of The Penguin Guide to Jazz wrote that the session's "importance... is the unique opportunity to hear two of the great modernist pioneers together." However, "Unfortunately, they seem to cancel one another out. Both are playing rather circumspectly, perhaps in deference to the other, and the real star of the session... turns out to be Israels."

Track listing
 "Shifting Down" (Dorham) — 10:43
 "Just Friends" (John Klenner, Lewis) — 6:17
 "Like Someone in Love" (Van Heusen, Burke) — 8:13
 "Double Clutching" (Israels) — 8:18

Personnel
 Cecil Taylor — piano
 Kenny Dorham — trumpet
 John Coltrane — tenor saxophone
 Chuck Israels — bass
 Louis Hayes — drums

References

1959 albums
John Coltrane albums
Cecil Taylor albums
Albums produced by Tom Wilson (record producer)
United Artists Records albums
Solid State Records (jazz label) albums
Blue Note Records albums